This is a list of lists of ghost towns in Canada. A ghost town is a town that once had a considerable population, that has since dwindled in numbers causing some or all its business to close, either due to the rerouting of a highway, train tracks being pulled, or exhaustion of some natural resource.

List of ghost towns in Alberta
List of ghost towns in British Columbia
List of ghost towns in Manitoba
List of ghost towns in Newfoundland and Labrador
List of ghost towns in the Northwest Territories
List of ghost towns in Nova Scotia
List of ghost towns in Nunavut
List of ghost towns in Ontario
List of ghost towns in Prince Edward Island
List of ghost towns in Quebec
List of ghost towns in Saskatchewan
List of ghost towns in Yukon

External links
Abandoned communities in Canada
Abandoned places in Canada